Karey (Krei) is an Austronesian language spoken on the Aru Islands of eastern Indonesia.

References

Aru languages
Languages of Indonesia